Sandro Ehrat (born 18 April 1991) is a Swiss tennis player. Ehrat has a career high ATP singles ranking of 286, achieved on 9 September 2019 and a career high ATP doubles ranking of 467, achieved on 12 July 2021. Ehrat made his ATP main draw debut at the 2010 MercedesCup, partnering Raphael Hemmeler in doubles, but they lost in the first round.

ATP Challengers and ITF Futures/World Tennis Tour Finals

Singles: 25 (11–14)

Doubles 9 (4–5)

External links
 
 

1991 births
Living people
Swiss male tennis players
People from Schaffhausen
Sportspeople from the canton of Schaffhausen